The desert whitethroat (Curruca minula) is a typical warbler. Until recently, it was considered conspecific with the lesser whitethroat as some authorities now reinstate. These are seen as members of a superspecies. The desert whitethroat together with Hume's whitethroat form an Asian lineage in the superspecies, which have diverged into species adapted to drier lowlands and moister mountain habitats respectively.
 The name small whitethroat has also been used by some authors, and desert lesser whitethroat before it was split from lesser whitethroat.

Description
It is distinguished from Hume's and lesser whitethroats by its smaller size (12 cm length, 8–13 g weight), smaller bill, the uniformly paler grey head lacking the well-marked dark cheeks of Hume's and lesser whitethroats, and a lighter grey-brown back; in these differences it follows Gloger's rule of pale colour in arid regions. The throat is white, and the rest of the underparts pale greyish-white.

Taxonomy
Three subspecies are currently recognised, though some authors only accept the first two as distinct.
 Curruca minula (syn. S. m. chuancheica). Western half of the species' range.
 Curruca jaxartica (included in S. m. minula by some authors). Central part of the species' range.
 Curruca minula margelanica. Eastern half of the species' range.

The presumed lesser whitethroat subspecies halimodendri and telengitica might actually belong to the desert whitethroat, or alternatively might represent hybrid intergrades between, respectively, C. m. jaxartica and C. m. margelanica and the lesser whitethroat.

Range and migration
Desert whitethroat inhabits arid lowland regions from eastern Iran and Turkmenistan eastwards to Xinjiang in central China, breeding in open dry thorn scrub. The breeding range does not overlap with lesser whitethroat, occurring to the southeast of that; it does overlap geographically with Hume's whitethroat but is separated altitudinally. The desert whitethroat migrates south to the Arabian Peninsula, southern Pakistan and northwestern India in the winter, where it does overlap with wintering lesser whitethroat in many areas, and more locally with wintering Hume's whitethroat. Vagrant is Sri Lanka, recorded in single time.

References

desert whitethroat
Birds of Central Asia
desert whitethroat
Taxobox binomials not recognized by IUCN